Tartu JK Merkuur was an Estonian football club based in Tartu. Merkuur was one of the founding members of the Meistriliiga, the top-tier of Estonian football. 2006, the last year of its existence, the club was known as JK Maag for sponsorship reasons. After finishing 5th in the Meistriliiga, the club merged with city rivals Tammeka under the name Tartu JK Maag Tammeka. They played their home matches in Tamme Stadium.

Merkuur Tartu in Estonian Football

* As Jk Maag Tartu

References

Maag Tartu
Maag Tartu
Association football clubs established in 1990
Defunct football clubs in Estonia
1990 establishments in Estonia
2008 disestablishments in Estonia